Hayden McLean (born 20 January 1999) is an Australian rules footballer playing for  in the Australian Football League (AFL). A 1.97-metre tall who can play as a ruckman or key forward, McLean began his career in the TAC Cup before a season in the Victorian Football League (VFL). He was recruited by Sydney on the eve of the 2019 season as a pre-season supplemental selection, and made his AFL debut later that year.

Junior career 
McLean attended St. Bede’s College in Mentone. He played junior football for the Beaumaris Sharks before joining the Sandringham Dragons in the TAC Cup. He also was a member of the AFL Academy – spending time at the Sydney Swans as part of the development program – and represented Vic Metro at the AFL Under 18 Championships. In 2017, McLean became Sandringham's captain and Vic Metro's vice-captain, but was overlooked in the 2017 AFL draft.

He began playing in the VFL for the Sandringham Zebras, who were affiliated with AFL club St Kilda. McLean played 13 matches in 2018, averaging 5.2 marks, 10.3 hit-outs and 13.2 disposals and rucking against AFL-listed players including Matthew Leuenberger, Braydon Preuss and Zac Smith. He was also named the club's best first-year player for 2018. McLean trained with St Kilda in November, hoping to be selected in the 2018 AFL draft, and was named by Fox Sports, which considered him similar to Adelaide ruck/forward Josh Jenkins, as a likely mature-age recruit. However, he was again overlooked and moved to Adelaide to play with South Australian National Football League (SANFL) club South Adelaide in 2019.

AFL career 
McLean was recruited by Sydney in March 2019 as a pre-season supplemental selection to cover the loss of defender Jack Maibaum to a season-ending anterior cruciate ligament injury. His recruitment also increased the club's depth of tall players after Kurt Tippett's retirement. McLean's selection was criticised by SANFL officials, as it deprived South Adelaide of an important recruit only a fortnight before their 2019 season began, leaving them unable to find a replacement in time. McLean spent most of his first season in Sydney's North East Australian Football League (NEAFL) side, before a call-up to the AFL team in round 18 – a challenging match-up rucking alongside Robbie Fox against  veteran Aaron Sandilands. He played three more matches to finish the season and extended his contract with Sydney to 2020.

2021
He kicked a career-high four goals in the Round 7 win against Geelong.

Statistics
Updated to the end of the 2022 season.

|-
| 2019 ||  || 41
| 4 || 0 || 1 || 23 || 20 || 43 || 12 || 19 || 53 || 0.0 || 0.3 || 5.8 || 5.0 || 10.8 || 3.0 || 4.8 || 13.3 || 0
|- 
| 2020 ||  || 41
| 6 || 5 || 1 || 24 || 14 || 38 || 13 || 15 || 14 || 0.8 || 0.2 || 4.0 || 2.3 || 6.3 || 2.2 || 2.5 || 2.3 || 0
|-
| 2021 ||  || 41
| 12 || 11 || 6 || 67 || 35 || 102 || 53 || 23 || 30 || 0.9 || 0.5 || 5.6 || 2.9 || 8.5 || 4.4 || 1.9 || 2.5 || 1
|- 
| 2022 ||  || 2
| 9 || 11 || 3 || 47 || 34 || 81 || 28 || 14 || 38 || 1.2 || 0.3 || 5.2 || 3.8 || 9.0 || 3.1 || 1.6 || 4.2 || 0
|- class=sortbottom
! colspan=3 | Career
! 31 !! 27 !! 11 !! 161 !! 103 !! 264 !! 106 !! 71 !! 135 !! 0.9 !! 0.4 !! 5.2 !! 3.3 !! 8.5 !! 3.4 !! 2.3 !! 4.4 !! 1
|}

Notes

References

External links 

Living people
1999 births
Australian rules footballers from Victoria (Australia)
Sandringham Dragons players
Sandringham Football Club players
Sydney Swans players